The Kolomna Locomotive Works (Kolomensky Zavod) is a major producer of railroad locomotives as well as locomotive and marine diesel engines in Russia. The plant started production in 1869 with a freight steam locomotive, one of the first in Russia. In the Czarist period before the Russian Revolution, Kolomna was one of a very few producers in Russia. During this period 139 types of steam locomotives were designed. The company is now (2015) a part of Transmashholding.

Overview 

The main activities of the company are: design, manufacturing and service of diesel engines (medium-speed diesel engines and diesel generators for diesel locomotives, power plants, heavy trucks, ships), mainline locomotives (passenger and freight), DC passenger electric locomotives.

The Kolomna plant is the only Russian producer of passenger locomotives, the creator of the first domestic examples of the main high-speed passenger EP200 AC locomotives, passenger DC electric EP2K, freight locomotives 2TE70. TEP70 passenger locomotives (along with modifications and TEP70 TEP70BS) provide much of the passenger traffic on non-electrified sections of the railways of Russia and CIS countries. The Kolomna plant is the largest Russian supplier of medium speed engines with an output from 450-5000 kW

History 

The factory was founded in 1863 at Kolomna by military engineer Amand Struve under the name Mechanical Engineering and Foundry Plant Struve Brothers. It was the first production plant for steel bridge structures for railways. In the second half of the 19th century, the plant began to build
locomotives, cars, riverboats and traction engines. In 1866 his brother Gustav joined the management, and the company name was changed to Plant Engineers Struve Brothers. In 1871 the company name was changed to Kolomna Machine-Building Plant. In 1935 the plant was named V.V. Kuybyshev Locomotive Factory.

The plant in Kolomna built the first Russian three-axle locomotive T-Series (1870), the world's first ship with a diesel engine "the Kolomna Diesel" (1907) and the first production Soviet diesel locomotive E el.

In the first years of Soviet power the plant manufactured (in small quantities) locomotives, wagons, streetcars and diesel engines. In 1931 the plant began to produce diesel locomotives and in 1932, in conjunction with the plant "Dinamo", electric locomotives of the VL19 series.

Prior to World War II (1941 - 1945), the plant produced steam locomotives, diesel locomotives, electric locomotives, diesel engines, tunnelling shields for subways, turbines, tenders and condensers for steam locomotives. During the war, the plant provided for the needs of the front. It repaired tanks, built armoured trains and manufactured ammunition. In 1943 the plant resumed production of steam locomotives and diesel engines. In November 1953 the plant produced its ten thousandth locomotive.

In 1956 the factory began serial production of diesel locomotives and diesel engines for locomotives, ships, submarines and diesel power plants. Passenger locomotives TEP60 and TEP70 began to perform the lion's share of passenger traffic on non-electrified lines in Russia, Belarus and Kazakhstan.

At the end of 1934 Kolomna Locomotive Works laid down three submarines of the Shchuka class under the numbers 313, 314 and 315. These were completed in the spring of 1937 and towed to the "Red Sormovo" factory in Nizhny Novgorod (presumably along the Oka River).

Honours
The plant was awarded the Order of Lenin (1939), Order of the Red Banner of Labour (1945) and Order of the October Revolution (1971).

Timeline 

 Steam Locomotive T-Series (1870-1915), freight and passenger steam locomotives for Russian and Soviet railways with wheel arrangements 0-6-0, 2-6-0 and 0-6-2
 E el (1932-1941), the serial diesel-electric freight locomotive with Ward Leonard control. Electrical equipment by Brown Boveri
 VL19 (1932-1938), main freight DC electric locomotive. This was the first and (until March 1953) the only serial electric locomotive design which was created in the Soviet Union
 TE3 (1956-1973), twelve-axle (type 2 (30-30)) freight locomotive of 2 × 2000 hp. In the 1960s this was the major driving force for non-electrified railways, replacing steam locomotives
 TEP60 (1960-1985), passenger diesel locomotive.
 TEP70 (1973-2006), passenger diesel locomotive.
 TEP70BS (2006-current), modernized version of the TEP70
 EP200 (1996), experimental high-speed AC electric locomotive. Two examples released in 1996. Maximum speed of 200 km / h.
 TEP80 (1988-1989), experimental passenger diesel locomotive. Two locomotives in this series were built

Locomotive TEP80-0002 set a world record for locomotive speed. The record is 271 km / h (1993).  The locomotive, with a commemorative inscription, is now in the museum at Varshavsky railway station, St. Petersburg. The second locomotive, also with a commemorative inscription, is located in Novosibirsk museum of railway equipment. The record was set by driver Mankiewicz Alexander on October 5, 1993, but is not listed in the Guinness Book of World Records and is declared by the manufacturer.

 2TE70 (2004-2010), a freight diesel locomotive with two six-axle sections. This is derived from passenger locomotives TEP70 and TEP70BS and is designed to haul freight trains weighing up to 6,000 tons.

Production 
 D41 D43 D47
 D200
 D42
 D300
 10D49 V16 , 16D49 V16
 20SD500 V20 10000 hp
 D500  16SD500 V16 , V12 for locomotives
 MTU Fhaven (Tognum TMH)

Gallery

References 

Locomotive manufacturers of Russia
Manufacturing companies of the Soviet Union
Diesel engine manufacturers
Marine engine manufacturers
Companies established in 1863
Transmashholding
Companies based in Moscow Oblast
Russian brands
Locomotive engine manufacturers
Engine manufacturers of Russia
Engine manufacturers of the Soviet Union